Fair Park is a recreation complex in Dallas, Texas.
Fair Park may also refer to:
 
Fair Park (Tyler, Texas), former ballpark of Tyler sports.
 Fair Park (Childress, Texas), a city park included in Childress Commercial and Civic Historic District
 Fair Park (DART station), light rail station servicing Dallas, Texas
 Fair Park, former amusement park located at the Tennessee State Fairgrounds in Nashville (now officially Fairgrounds Nashville)
 Fair Park Medical Careers Magnet High School, high school in Shreveport, Louisiana, formerly known as Fair Park High School